Heinrik Haraldsson  was a son of Harald Maddadsson and his first wife Affrica.

Sources
 Pálsson, Hermann and Paul Edwards, tr. Orkneyinga Saga: The History of the Earls of Orkney (Penguin, London, 1978)

13th-century mormaers